The Music of Nashville: Season 3, Volume 1 is the fifth soundtrack album for the American musical drama television series Nashville, created by Academy Award winner Callie Khouri and starring Connie Britton as country music superstar Rayna Jaymes and Hayden Panettiere as new star Juliette Barnes. The album was released digitally and (exclusive to Target stores in North America) physically on December 9, 2014 through Big Machine Records.

Track listing

Commercial reception
The album debuted on the Billboard 200 at No. 75 with 11,000 copies sold in the US.  The album has sold 40,500 copies in the US as of May 2015.

Charts

Weekly charts

Year-end charts

References

Television soundtracks
2014 soundtrack albums
Big Machine Records soundtracks
Country music soundtracks
Music of Nashville: Season 3, Volume 1